Fear is a 2006 thriller by Jeff Abbott. Texas Monthly described the novel as a "pharmaco-thriller about a clandestine medical clinic".

Plot
Miles Kendrick suffers from Post-traumatic stress disorder and is in a witness protection program. When his psychiatrist is targeted and killed he feels somehow responsible and sets about trying to find out why she was killed and avenge her death. A constant companion is his best friend whom he killed some time in the past.

References

External links
  Fear on the official Jeff Abbott site
  Review on Mostly Fiction website

American thriller novels
2006 American novels
E. P. Dutton books